McNairy is a surname. Notable people with the surname include:

John McNairy (1762–1837), United States federal judge in Tennessee
Mark McNairy (born 1961), American fashion designer
Scoot McNairy, American actor

See also
McNairy, Tennessee, an unincorporated community in the United States
McNairy County, Tennessee, county located in the U.S. state of Tennessee